Little Punjab may refer to:

Punjab Avenue, an area of New York City
Punjabi Market, Vancouver, Canada
Little Punjab, in Paldi, British Columbia, Canada

See also
Punjab
Punjabi diaspora